Jaclyn "Jackie" Traina (born November 5, 1991) is an American former collegiate four-time All-American softball pitcher.

Career
She attended Naples High School in the city. She later attended the University of Alabama, where she was a starting pitcher for the Alabama Crimson Tide softball team in the Southeastern Conference, leading them to the 2012 Women's College World Series title. Traina was named the 2012 Women's College World Series Most Outstanding Player. She currently ranks in several career records for the school. She also ranks for the conference and the NCAA Division I for numerous softball categories. Traina also played for Team USA softball and later coached for Dartmouth College.

Career Statistics

References

External links
 
Alabama bio
USA Softball Bio

1991 births
American softball players
Softball players from Florida
Alabama Crimson Tide softball players
Living people
Sportspeople from Naples, Florida
Softball players at the 2015 Pan American Games
Women's College World Series Most Outstanding Player Award winners